Rita Martinson (born September 11, 1937) is an American politician. She served as a member of the Mississippi House of Representatives from the 58th District from 1992 to 2016. She is a member of the Republican party. She decided not to seek reelection in 2015.

References

1937 births
Living people
Republican Party members of the Mississippi House of Representatives
Women state legislators in Mississippi
People from Gloster, Mississippi
21st-century American politicians
21st-century American women politicians